Jerry Steinberg is the "Founding Non-Father" of No Kidding! International, a social club for childfree and childless singles and couples.  He founded the organization in his home city of Vancouver, BC, Canada in 1984.  Since then, the organization has grown to include numerous chapters in several countries.

He also co-founded Airspace Action on Smoking and Health, the anti-smoking organization.

Career
He is a graduate of Hamilton Teachers' College and has a degree in Linguistics and French from the University of Guelph, in Guelph, Ontario, Canada.  In addition to his volunteer work (volunteering for the Royal Canadian Mounted Police, and helping smokers break their addiction), he has been teaching English and French as Second Languages to children and adults in Ontario, Quebec and British Columbia since 1968. He is the author of two books, "Games Language People Play" and "Whatcha Gonna Learn from Comics?," which are published by the University of Toronto Press, and are available from Amazon and other online booksellers.

References

External links 
No Kidding! International
Airspace
child-free.com, website of the No Kidding spokespeople.
Childfree in the Media. 2000. Childfree Resource Network. 6 Dec. 2005.

Businesspeople from Vancouver
Year of birth missing (living people)
Living people
Childfree